Svanshall is a small fishing village on the western coast of northwest Skåne County, southwest Sweden, about 25 km north of Helsingborg. The nearest village to the south is Jonstorp; north along the coast are the villages of Skäret and Arild. The village has a small marina and lighthouse. On July 15, 1749, it was passed by Carl Linnaeus on his Scanian trip. It is a surfing location.

References

Populated places in Skåne County
Surfing locations